Tarmo is an Estonian and Finnish male given name.

People named Tarmo include:
Tarmo Jallai (born 1979), Estonian track and field athlete and Olympic competitor
Tarmo Kikerpill (born 1977), Estonian professional basketball player
Tarmo Kink (born 1985), Estonian professional footballer
Tarmo Koivisto (born 1948), Finnish comics artist and writer, cartoonist, and graphic artist 
Tarmo Koivuranta (born 1980), Finnish footballer 
Tarmo Kõuts (born 1953), Estonian politician and former commander-in-chief of the Estonian Defence Forces
Tarmo Kruusimäe (born 1967), Estonian politician and musician
Tarmo Laht (born 1960), Estonian architect
Tarmo Leinatamm (1957–2014), Estonian conductor and politician 
Tarmo Linnumäe (born 1971), Estonian footballer 
Tarmo Loodus (born 1958), Estonian educator and politician
Tarmo Mänd (born 1950), Estonian politician
Tarmo Manni (born 1921–1999), Finnish actor
Tarmo Mitt (born 1977), Estonian professional strongman 
Tarmo Neemelo (born 1982), Estonian footballer
Tarmo Oja (born 1934), Estonian-Swedish astronomer 
Tarmo Pihlap (1952–1999), Estonian singer and guitarist
Tarmo Reunanen (born 1998), Finnish ice hockey player
Tarmo Rüütli (born 1954), Estonian football midfielder and coach 
Tarmo Saks (born 1975), Estonian football forward from Estonia
Tarmo Soomere (born 1957), Estonian marine scientist and mathematician
Tarmo Tamm (born 1953), Estonian politician
Tarmo Teder (born 1958), Estonian writer, poet and critic
Tarmo Uusivirta (1957–1999), Finnish boxer
Tarmo Virkus (born 1971), Estonian rower

References

Estonian masculine given names
Finnish masculine given names